Yeltsino is a rural locality (a selo) in Razdolyevskoye Rural Settlement, Kolchuginsky District, Vladimir Oblast, Russia. The population was 112 as of 2010. There are 4 streets.

Geography 
Yeltsino is located 20 km southeast of Kolchugino (the district's administrative centre) by road. Gridenka is the nearest rural locality.

References 

Rural localities in Kolchuginsky District